This is a timeline of the history of the broadcasting of children’s programmes on BBC Television.

1930s 
 1936
 2 November – The BBC opens the world's first regular high-definition television service, from Alexandra Palace.

 1937
 24 April – The very first children's television show For the Children is broadcast.

 1938
 No events.

 1939
 1 September – The BBC Television Service is suspended, about 20 minutes after the conclusion of a Mickey Mouse cartoon (Mickey's Gala Premiere), owing to the imminent outbreak of the Second World War amid fears that the VHF transmissions would act as perfect guidance beams for enemy bombers attempting to locate central London. Additionally, the service's technicians and engineers will be needed for war efforts such as the development of radar. On radio, the National and Regional Programmes are combined to form a single Home Service.

1940s 
 1940 to  1945
No events due to television being closed for the duration of the Second World War.

 1946
7 June – The BBC Television Service begins broadcasting again. The first words heard are "Good afternoon everybody. How are you? Do you remember me, Jasmine Bligh?". The Mickey Mouse cartoon Mickey's Gala Premiere that had been the last programme transmitted seven years earlier at the start of World War II, is reshown after Bligh's introduction.
7 July – The BBC's children's programme For the Children returns, one of the few pre-war programmes to resume after the reintroduction of the BBC Television Service.
4 August – Children's puppet "Muffin the Mule" debuts in an episode of For the Children. He is so popular he is given his own show later in the year on a new service Watch with Mother.

 1947
 No events.

 1948
 No events.

 1949
 No events.

1950s 
 1950
11 July – Andy Pandy premieres on the BBC Television Service.

 1951
 No events.

 1952
16 January – Sooty, Harry Corbett's glove puppet bear, first appears on the BBC Television Service.
December –  For the Children is broadcast for the final time.
 Watch With Mother, the iconic pre-schoolers strand, makes its debut. It would run until 1975. 

 1953
 No events. 

 1954
 No events.

 1955
10 January – Annette Mills dies from a heart attack after an operation. Following her death, Muffin the Mule is dropped by the BBC Television Service.
16 January – Sooty becomes a programme in its own right.

 1956
 No events.

 1957
 No events.

 1958
 16 October – First broadcast of the United Kingdom's longest-running children's television show Blue Peter.

 1959
 No events.

1960s 
 1960
 No events.

 1961
No events.

 1962
 No events.

 1963
April – Watch With Mother is moved to a mid-morning slot and from September, the lunchtime broadcast is reintroduced.

 1964
 21 April –  The first edition of Play School is broadcast. It is transmitted on the new BBC2 channel which had launched the previous evening but the launch night was affected by a power cut which resulted in Play School becoming the first programme to air on the new channel. 
 28 September –  Blue Peter is now shown twice a week, on Mondays and Thursdays with each episode extended from 15 to 25 minutes.

 1965
18 October – The Magic Roundabout makes its debut  on BBC1. and would run until 1977.
13 December – Storytelling series Jackanory makes its debut on BBC1. It would run until 1996 and was briefly revived in 2006.

 1966 
 3 January – Camberwick Green is the second programme on BBC1 to be shot in colour.

 1967
 25 December – Sooty is shown for the final time on the BBC, it would transfer to the newly-launched ITV franchise Thames the following year.

 1968
 No events.

 1969
 No events.

1970s 

 1970
 14 September –  Blue Peter is broadcast in colour for the first time but black and white editions continue to be shown on occasion until 1974.

 1971
 No events.

 1972
 4 April – The first edition of Newsround is broadcast on BBC1, hosted by John Craven.

 1973
5 February – Elisabeth Beresford's well known popular children's characters The Wombles have spawned into a stop motion animated television series narrated by Bernard Cribbins and composed by Mike Batt on BBC1.

 1974
 14 January – Pre-school educational series You and Me is broadcast for the first time.

 1975
 The Watch With Mother title is dropped as it was considered to be dated.

 1976
 2 October – The first edition of Saturday morning children’s magazine show Multi-Coloured Swap Shop is broadcast. It runs throughout the morning on BBC1.

 1977
 No events.

 1978
 8 February – The first episode of school drama Grange Hill is broadcast on BBC1.

 1979
 No events.

1980s 
 1980
1 October – BBC1's lunchtime children's programme is labelled See Saw for the first time.

 1981
 No events.

 1982
27 March – The final edition of Saturday morning children’s magazine show Multi-Coloured Swap Shop is broadcast.
17 April – The BBC launches its first Summer Saturday morning magazine programme, Get Set. However, unlike its Winter counterpart, the Summer shows air only for the first half of the morning so that Grandstand can start at 10:55am so that it can show live test cricket and on the weeks that cricket is not being shown, a feature film is broadcast from around 11am until the start of Grandstand at 12:30pm.
2 October – The first edition of Multi-Coloured Swap Shop Saturday morning replacement show Saturday Superstore is broadcast on BBC1. It adopts a similar format to its predecessor.
1 November – All BBC-produced Welsh-language programming including children's programmes, is transferred from BBC1 to the new S4C channel.

 1983
19 September – Due to the transfer of programmes for schools and colleges to BBC2, the morning broadcast of Play School moves to BBC1.

 1984
21 April – The Saturday Picture Show replaces Get Set as the BBC's Summer Saturday morning magazine programme. Its running time is extended and begins at the earlier time of 8:45am.
Computerised graphics begin to be shown as part of the children's continuity as a way of differentiating children's output from the rest of BBC1's programming. However, the actual programme continues to be introduced over the BBC1 globe.

 1985
29 March – Play School is shown in the afternoon for the final time.
9 September – The weekday afternoon block of children's programming is rebranded as Children's BBC and for the first time the children's block has dedicated idents and an in-vision presenter. Previously, children's programming had been introduced by BBC1's team of regular duty announcers.
October – A weekday 20-minute morning slot of Gaelic children's programmes begins on BBC One Scotland. The programmes are generally shown in term-time before Play School, starting at 10:10am.

 1986
27 March – Following the launch the previous Autumn of in-vision continuity for children's programmes, for the first time, in-vision presentation is introduced to holiday weekday morning children's programmes. The Easter period's ten programmes are presented by Roland Rat and are called Roland Rat's Easter Extravaganza.
1 April – As part of the BBC's Drugwatch campaign, BBC1 airs It's Not Just Zammo, a Newsround special presented by John Craven and Nick Ross that seeks to warn younger viewers about the dangers of using drugs. The programme follows a recent drug abuse storyline in Grange Hill involving the character Zammo McGuire (played by Lee MacDonald), and features the launch of a version of the anti-drugs song "Just Say No" recorded by members of the Grange Hill cast. 
8 July - BBC1 Scotland launch their new weekday children's programme for the Scottish school Summer holidays,  billed as C.T.V.1, presented by Ross King and Rhoda McLeod as an opt out of Pages from Ceefax between 9:20am and 10:20am, concluding on 25 July.
 27 October – BBC1 starts a full daytime television service. This includes a new morning programme block for children which lasts for 30 minutes. In addition to the continued broadcasting of Play School, a birthday slot is introduced along with a cartoon.

 1987
18 April – The final edition of Saturday Superstore is broadcast on BBC1.
25 April – It's Wicked replaces The Saturday Picture Show as the BBC's Summer Saturday morning magazine programme. It runs for just the one series.
22 June – The BBC's lunchtime children's programme moves from BBC1 to BBC2. It is shown slightly earlier, at 1:20pm.
3 July – But First This launches as BBC1’s new weekday school holidays children’s morning programming block. Described as “a sort of magazine between the programmes”, it airs each weekday during the holidays between 9:05am and midday.
26 September – Debut of Going Live!, a new live magazine show, broadcast on BBC1 and presented by Phillip Schofield and Sarah Greene.
11 October – A new Sunday morning children's strand Now on Two launches. It is broadcast between October and January during the during the Open University off-season.

 1988
23 April–10 September – Two Saturday morning magazine shown are shown on Saturday morning this Summer. On the Waterfront is aired for the first part of the Summer with UP2U taking over in mid-July.
16 October – Play School is broadcast for the final time. The last new edition had been shown in March.
17 October – Playbus, the replacement programme for Play School is broadcast for the first time.

 1989
22 April–16 September – Again, two Saturday morning magazine programmes shown are shown on Saturday morning this Summer as On the Waterfront which is aired for the first part of the Summer. with UP2U taking over in mid-July.
22 June – After more than 17 years, John Craven steps down as presenter of Newsround.
8 November – The first edition of Byker Grove is broadcast. The teen drama, set in a youth club, will air for the next 17 years.
25 December – Playbus is renamed as Playdays.

1990s 
 1990
21 April – The BBC reverts to airing just one Summer Saturday morning magazine show and replaces On the Waterfront and UP2U with a new show The 8.15 from Manchester, named after its start time and its broadcast location.

 1991
18 February – BBC Scotland’s live children’s magazine programme Breakout is aired as a one-off show presented by Ashley Jensen and Bill Petrie to coincide with Scottish schools’ half-term break, it is aired on BBC One Scotland at 10:05am–10:35am.
29 March – The second edition of BBC Scotland's Breakout programme is aired to coincide with the Scottish schools' Easter holiday break, airing in a earlier timeslot of 9:05am–9:55am on BBC One Scotland. 
1 July - Breakout returns for a week-long stint of five shows airing over the first week of the Scottish school holidays at 11:05am–11:55am on BBC One Scotland, ending on 5 July.
9 September – New idents launched featuring the BBC corporate logo.

 1992
26 March – The final original edition of pre-school educational series You and Me is broadcast although repeats continue to be aired until 1995.
25 April – Parallel 9 replaces The 8.15 from Manchester as BBC1's Saturday morning Summer magazine programme.
29 June – BBC Scotland launch their own regional version of Children's BBC with a brand new school Summer holiday programming block called The Ice Cream Van is aired for the first fortnightly period, the block was presented by a rotating team of Dotaman's John Urquhart, Di Christie and Steve McKenna who toured around Scotland in the show’s Ice Cream Van to introduce a sparkling line-up of TV entertainment for Scottish youngsters to brighten up their break from school, including eight episodes of Harry and the Hendersons that were yet to be screened in Scotland at the time, The Ice Cream Van was aired live on BBC One Scotland at 9:05am–10:35am for a fortnightly period until 10th July.

 1993
17 April – The final edition of the magazine programme, Going Live! airs.
5 July - Children's BBC Scotland returns to BBC One Scotland for the first week of the Scottish school Summer holidays, now presented by Grant Stott between 9:05am and 10:35am until 9th July, featuring a brand new teen magazine programme called MegaMag airing it's first series across the week at 9:30am.
2 October – A new magazine programme, Live & Kicking makes its debut on BBC1, presented by Andi Peters, Emma Forbes and John Barrowman.
18 October - Children's BBC Scotland airs on BBC One Scotland between 9:05am and 10:35am in the second week of the half-term holidays until 22nd October. 

 1994
 4 July - Children’s BBC Scotland returns for a third year on BBC One Scotland, the Scottish summer holiday slot is still presented by Grant Stott for the first week of the school holidays, airing betweeen 9.05am - 10.35am until 8th July.
5 September – The idents get a refresh with new 3D graphics.
17 October - BBC Scotland airs a regional version of the Children's BBC Breakfast Show between 7am and 8am on BBC Two Scotland throughout the half-term holidays. The hour-long slot is presented by Grant Stott until 21st October the mid-morning slot on BBC One Scotland is now presented out-of-vision between 9:05am and 10am the same week.

 1995
21 April – At the end of its 42nd series, the final edition of Why Don't You? is broadcast. The programme ends after nearly 22 years on the air.
22 April – Fully Booked replaces Parallel 9 as BBC1's Saturday morning Summer magazine programme.
3 July - Children's BBC Scotland mid-mornings returns to BBC One Scotland between 9.05am - 10.35am, Long-serving presenter Grant Stott is now joined by new co-host Gail Porter to introduce children's entertainment for the first week of the school holidays until 7th July Grant and Gail return to host the Children's BBC Breakfast Show on BBC Two Scotland between 7.15am - 8.25am in the second week of the school holidays from 16th - 20th October.
9 October – Children's programmes begin to be shown on BBC2 during the peak breakfast period and the strand is called the Children's BBC Breakfast Show.
Blue Peter is now shown three times a week, on Mondays, Wednesdays and Fridays.

 1996
24 March – After more than 30 years on the air, the final edition of storytelling series  Jackanory is broadcast, although it would be revived briefly in 2006. 
10 June–23 August – For the Summer period, the late afternoon block of children's programmes aired on BBC1 are transferred to BBC2.
3 July - The Children's BBC Breakfast Show on BBC Two Scotland is presented by Grant Stott and Gail Porter throughout the opening weeks of the Scottish school Summer holidays, airing between 7:30am–8:35am until 12th July then returning for a further week at the same timeslot between the 14th and 18th October.

 1997
28 March – The final episode of Playdays  is broadcast. 
31 March – The first episode of  Teletubbies airs on BBC2.
30 June - BBC Two Scotland launches a brand new Summer holiday children's programme called Up For It! airing between 8:35am and 9:30am for the first three weeks of the Scottish school holidays until 18th July, the brand new show is presented by Gail Porter and featured episodes of the Smurfs' Adventures that aired to Scottish viewers a month earlier compared to the rest of the UK. Up For It! returned for another run the following Summer with Marsali Stewart on hosting duties to introduce episodes of Kenan and Kel, Sweet Valley High and The Simpsons that were aired in Scotland a month earlier to the network, the second series of Up For It aired between 29th June - 17th July 1998.
4 October – The new BBC corporate logo comes into use and new idents featuring various animations on a yellow background is now officially called CBBC.

 1998
23 September – The BBC launches BBC Choice, its first new TV channel since 1964, available only on digital TV services. Children’s programming forms part of the output from the start, aired on weekend afternoons as CBBC Choice and included strands like Dog & Dinosaur, The Crew Room, L&K Replay and Re:Peter.

 1999
6 September – The children's programme Tweenies makes its debut on BBC2 at 10:30am and again at 3:25pm on BBC1.
29 November – From that day, children's programming is broadcast all day on BBC Choice. Branded CBBC on Choice, children's programming is broadcast on the channel every day from 6am until 7pm. Aimed at young children, with presentation links pre-recorded by a CBBC presenter. It includes repeats of archive shows rarely seen on the main channels.

2000s 
 2000
3 July - CBBC Scotland is aired on BBC Two Scotland for the final time as a summer holiday opt-out from the network, airing with a out-of-vision presenter between 10.50am - 12.00pm until 7th July.
23 September – The final edition of Summer Saturday morning children's magazine show Fully Booked is broadcast. This brings to an end an almost 20 year run of BBC1 Summer only Saturday children's magazine shows.
7 October – Live & Kicking returns with a new look and became the first Saturday morning magazine show on BBC One to air all year round.

 2001
15 September – The BBC One magazine show Live & Kicking comes to an end after eight years. The final edition is presented by Sarah Cawood, Heather Suttie, Ortis Deley and Trey Farley.
22 September – The first episode of The Saturday Show airs, presented by Dani Behr and Joe Mace.

 2002
11 February – Two new BBC children's channels, CBeebies (aimed at children under 6) and CBBC (aimed at children aged 6–12) launch. The new channel sees the launch of through-the-day editions of Newsround and the introduction of weekend editions. Newsround Showbiz is also launched at around the same time. This also coincided with new idents known as the Bugs.

 2003
No events.

 2004
No events.

2005
3 September – After several revamps and presenting changes, BBC One airs the final edition of its children's entertainment series The Saturday Show.
10 September – Sportsround, a weekly spin-off from CBBC children's news programme Newsround is launched.  The sports magazine show was broadcast on Friday evenings at 6:30pm on CBBC Channel and on Saturday mornings on BBC Two.
1 October – CBBC's identity is relaunched, with its second new look since the launch of the CBBC Channel, known as the Green Gumdrop. 
5 October – The 6am CBeebies programming block on BBC Two ends and is replaced by an hour of  Pages from Ceefax.
21 December – The BBC announces that it is to trial a three-month experiment in which its Saturday morning schedules for BBC One and BBC Two will be swapped. The changes, taking effect from January 2006, are being implemented because of frequent scheduling changes caused by big events and breaking news stories, and will mean children's programming will be absent from BBC One's Saturday morning lineup for the first time since 1976.
Newsround Showbiz ends after three years on the air.
CBBC Extra launches on the BBC Red Button.

 2006
10 December – The 344th and final edition of Byker Grove is broadcast. The teen drama, set in a youth club, ends after 17 years.
25 December – The weekday 6am CBeebies programming block on BBC Two is reintroduced.

 2007
May – It is announced that Blue Peter will be aired twice a week. The BBC argues that by dropping one show the quality of the programme’s content will improve.
3 September – CBBC launches another new look with a stylised ident. 
20 October – BBC Switch, a teenage block of shows is launched to cater for the under-served 12 to 16-year-olds.
1 December – BBC HD channel is officially launched after around eighteen months of trial broadcasts.
25 December – BBC iPlayer, an online service for watching previously aired shows, is launched.

 2008
11 February – CBBC on BBC One was shifted to run 3:05–5:15pm rather than 3:25–5:35pm as before in order to accommodate The Weakest Link moving from BBC Two to BBC One. The changes are made following the BBC's loss of the rights to the soap opera Neighbours which had for many years been broadcast between the end of CBBC and the start of the 6 o’clock news.
20 March – The remit of CBBC is altered to remove the schools programming element from the channel.
15 September – BBC One airs the 601st and final episode of Grange Hill after a 30 year run.

 2009
No events.

2010s
2010
10 September – The CBBC idents gets a slight refresh. 
11 December – The final episode of Sportsround is broadcast after five years on the air. It is replaced by a new sports show Match of the Day Kickabout which airs in Sportsrounds original BBC Two slot on Saturday mornings.
18 December – BBC Switch is switched off.2011May – CBBC is relocated to BBC Bridge House at MediaCityUK in Salford Quays.
September – Blue Peter relocates to its new home at MediaCityUK.
November – Newsround begins broadcasting from MediaCityUK.201212 January – Blue Peter is now only broadcast once a week for the first time since 1964 and for the first time in the show's history, first-run episodes were now broadcast on the CBBC Channel at 5:45pm on Thursdays. However, a repeat was still broadcast the following day on BBC One.
21 December – CBBC and CBeebies both air on BBC One for the last time.20134 January – CBBC and CBeebies both air on BBC Two for the last time. 
10 December – HD broadcasts begin for CBBC and CBeebies.201413 September – A new set of CBBC idents launches while keeping the existing logo.2015No events.201614 March – A new CBBC logo appears alongside new idents. 
11 April – CBBC extends its broadcast hours from 7pm to 9pm, using capacity which had previously been used by BBC Three that went off the air in February. 
CBBC Extra which had been broadcast on the BBC Red Button since 2005 ends.201730 September – CBBC programming returns to BBC Two on Saturday mornings when Saturday Mash-Up! is launched in an attempt to recapture the spirit of classic BBC programmes such as Going Live! and Live & Kicking.2018No events.2019No events.

2020s
 202028 July – The BBC axes the teatime edition of Newsround after 48 years after concluding that the typical child no longer turns on traditional television channels when they return home from school. They will focus on the morning edition instead which will be aimed at schools where it is often used by teachers in classrooms, in addition to investing in the programme's website.

 202127 March –  Match of the Day Kickabout is broadcast for the final time.

 20225 January – The relaunch of BBC Three sees CBBC’s hours reduced, ending its broadcast day two hours earlier, at 7pm instead of 9pm.New Year change to CBBC hours
3 September – CBeebies programming returns on Saturday mornings on BBC Two at 6:35am, with CBBC programming moving to 7:20am. The stand is officially named as the Saturday Kids Zone (often known as the Saturday Morning Kids Zone or simply the Kids Zone).

 2023'
15 March – CBBC and CBeebies both rebranded their on-screen bugs and identity to match the BBC's 2021 logo.

See also 
Timeline of children's television on ITV
Timeline of children's television on other British TV channels

References

Television in the United Kingdom by year
BBC television timelines